Alcobaça may refer to:

In Brazil
 Alcobaça, Bahia

In Portugal
 Alcobaça, Portugal
 Alcobaça Municipality
 Alcobaça Monastery
 Alcobaça wine